The Justiciar of Scotia (in Norman-Latin, Justiciarus Scotie) was the most senior legal office in the High Medieval Kingdom of Scotland. Scotia (meaning Scotland) in this context refers to Scotland to the north of the River Forth and River Clyde. The other Justiciar positions were the Justiciar of Lothian and the Justiciar of Galloway.

The institution has some Anglo-Norman origins, but in Scotland north of the Forth it represented some form of continuity with an older office, a senior version of a Judex or Brithem, a native Scottish lawman often with province-wide responsibilities. Mormaer Causantín of Fife was styled judex magnus (i.e. "great Brehon") in Scotia, and it is probable that the Justiciarship of Scotia was just a further Latinisation/Normanisation of that position. By the middle of the thirteenth century, the responsibilities of the Justiciar became fully formalised. He supervised the activity and behaviour of royal sheriffs and sergeants, held courts and reported on these things to the king personally.

List of Justiciars of Scotia, to 1400
The following list, going up to 1400, consists of names who appears as Justiciar of Scotia in sources. The sources, especially in the twelfth century, are far from exhaustive, and so many names are doubtless missing. In the earliest period, there could be more than one Justiciar in operation at the same point in time.

 Causantín, Mormaer of Fife, judex magnus in Scotia, 1128x30
 Duncan II, Mormaer of Fife, 1154x1164-1203
 Matthew, Bishop of Aberdeen, 1172x1199
 Gille Brigte, Mormaer of Strathearn, 1172x1199
 William Comyn, Earl of Buchan, 1205–32
 Walter fitz Alan, High Steward, appointed 2 Feb 1231/2 to 1241
 Philip de Melville and Robert de Monte Alto [Robert de Mowat, elder, was appointed April 1241], 1241–44.
 Alan Durward, Royal Hostarius, 1244–51
 Philip de Meldrum or Ferdarg (Feradach) and Michael de Monte Alto, 1251–53
 Alan Durward, Royal Hostarius, 1255–57
 Alexander Comyn, Earl of Buchan, 1258–89
 Andrew Moray (father of the famous Andrew Moray), 1289x93-96x
William de Mortimer (1296–97)
 John Comyn, Earl of Buchan, 1300-x1305
 English Tetrarchy, 2 North and 2 South of the Mounth, 1305-6:
 Reginald Cheyne and John de Vaux 1305-06.
 Sir William de Montifex of Auchterarder, of Stobhall and of Cargill. Before 1328.
 Sir Robert Lauder of Quarrelwood and The Bass, appointed 1328 (d. 1370).
 Sir Malcolm Drummond of that Ilk, & c., (d. 1428) before 1400.

References

 Barow, G.W.S., "The Judex", in Barrow (ed.) The Kingdom of the Scots, (Edinburgh, 2003), pp. 57–67
 Barow, G.W.S. "The Justiciar", in Barrow (ed.) The Kingdom of the Scots, (Edinburgh, 2003), pp. 68–111

Lists of office-holders in Scotland
Medieval Scots law
Scots law formal titles
College of Justice
12th-century establishments in Scotland